John Fralick (Jack) Rockart (1931 – February 3, 2014) was an American organizational theorist, and Senior Lecturer Emeritus at the Center for Information Systems Research at the MIT Sloan School of Management.

Biography 
Born in New York City, Rockart received his AB from the Woodrow Wilson School of Public and International Affairs at Princeton University, his MBA from Harvard Business School, and in 1968 his PhD in management from MIT.

After graduation, Rockart started his academic career as Instructor in the MIT Sloan School of Management. In 1967 he was appointed Assistant Professor, in 1970 Associate Professor, and in 1974 Senior Lecturer. Since 1976 he was also Director of the MIT Center for Information Systems Research (CISR), where he was succeeded by Peter Weill in 2000.

In 1989 Rockart was awarded the Nonfiction Computer Press Association Book of the Year Award; and in 2003, the Leo Award by the Association for Information Systems.

Rockart was  founding editor-in-chief of the MIS Quarterly Executive.

Rockart's research interests focused on the "managers’ usage of computer-based information with a special concentration on the need to design information flow for effective decision making... [and] the changing role of information technology and the implementation of integrated global systems."

Selected publications
Books and papers:
 Bullen, Christine V., and John F. Rockart. A primer on critical success factors. (1981).
 Rockart, John F., and David W. De Long. Executive support systems: The emergence of top management computer use. Dow Jones-Irwin, 1988.

Articles, a selection:
 Rockart, John F. "Chief executives define their own data needs." Harvard Business Review 57.2 (1979): 81.
 Rockart, John F. "The changing role of the information systems executive: a critical success factors perspective." Sloan Management Review Fall 1982; 24, pp. 3–13
 Rockart, John F., and Lauren S. Flannery. "The management of end user computing." Communications of the ACM 26.10 (1983): 776-784.
 Malone, Thomas W., and John F. Rockart. "Computers, networks and the corporation." Scientific American 265.3 (1991): 128-136.
 Rockart, John F., Michael J. Earl, and Jeanne W. Ross. "Eight imperatives for the new IT organization." Sloan management review 38.1 (1996): 43-55.

References

External links 
 MIT CISR remembers Jack Rockart at cisr.mit.edu, 2014.02.05.
 Jack Rockart, 82; cofounded IT research center at MIT at bostonglobe.com 2014.02.26.
 John F. "Jack" Rockart: Obituary

1931 births
2014 deaths
American business theorists
Information systems researchers
Princeton School of Public and International Affairs alumni
Harvard Business School alumni
MIT Sloan School of Management alumni
MIT Sloan School of Management faculty